Ninnistham Ennishtam is a 1986 Indian Malayalam-language film, directed by Alleppey Ashraf. The film stars Mohanlal, Priya, Sukumari and Jagathy Sreekumar . The film has musical score by Kannur Rajan. This is remake of Charlie Chaplin's movie City Lights. Alleppey Ashraf later directed a Tamil remake titled Neela Kuyil (1995), starring Pandiarajan.It was Mohanlal's 100th Film.

Cast

Mohanlal as Sreekuttan
Priya as Shalini / Chikku 
Sukumari as Kakkathiyamma
Jagathy Sreekumar as Kurup
Mukesh as Ramakrishna Pillai
Sankaradi as doctor
Sreenivasan as Jithinlal-Madanlal
Kundara Johny as Achu 
Kuthiravattam Pappu as Thirukkuthu Kumaran
Lalithasree
Mala Aravindan as Chakrapani
Poojappura Ravi
Thodupuzha Vasanthi
Kavara Sasankan
 JP Jayakumar as Cheruplasheri Krishnan Nair.

Soundtrack
The music was composed by Kannur Rajan and the lyrics were written by Mankombu Gopalakrishnan.

Sequel
A sequel to the film named Ninnishtam Ennishtam 2 directed by Alleppey Ashraf himself was released on 	
28 July 2011.

References

External links
 

1986 films
1980s Malayalam-language films
Indian drama films
Malayalam films remade in other languages
Films directed by Alleppey Ashraf
Films scored by Kannur Rajan
Ninnishtam1